The Party of Tatar National Independence Ittifaq or Ittifak is a political party founded in the Tatar ASSR in April, 1990, and officially registered on January 3, 1992. Ittifaq was the first non-communist party in Tatarstan.  It is commonly referred to as a Tatar nationalist party.  It was named in honour of Ittifaq al-Muslimin, a pre-revolutionary Muslim political party represented in the parliament (Duma) of the czarist Russia.

The aims, as claimed by the party, are:
 revival of the Tatar nation
 restoring Tatar statehood
 recognition of the Tatar state as an international entity.

The permanent leader of the Ittifaq party is Fauziya Bayramova.  She has been leading the party for more than 20 years.  The party published its own newspaper - Altyn Urda - from 1993 to 1998.

References

See also
All-Tatar Public Center
Secession in Russia
1990 establishments in Russia
History of Tatarstan
Indigenist political parties
Nationalist parties in Russia
Political parties established in 1990
Political parties of minorities in Russia
Politics of Tatarstan
Pro-independence parties in the Soviet Union
Separatism in Russia
Tatar nationalism
Tatar political parties